Ri Chong-il (born 29 September 1982) is a North Korean former footballer. He represented North Korea on at least one occasion in 2002.

Career statistics

International

References

1982 births
Living people
North Korean footballers
North Korea international footballers
Association football midfielders